Isaac Kuffour (born 30 December 1978) is a retired Ghanaian football striker.

He played for Asante Kotoko F.C. and Okwawu United in Ghana, then from 2002 to 2006 in Melaka TMFC in Malaysia. He was also capped for Ghana, and was a squad member in the 1997 Korea Cup.

References

1978 births
Living people
Ghanaian footballers
Asante Kotoko S.C. players
Okwawu United players
Melaka TM FC players
Expatriate footballers in Malaysia
Ghanaian expatriate footballers
Ghanaian expatriate sportspeople in Malaysia
Ghana international footballers
Association football forwards